Károly Jenő Ujfalvy de Mezőkövesd (16 May 1842 – 31 January 1904) was a noted Austro-Hungarian ethnographic researcher and linguist. of Central Asia and the Himalayas. Also known as Charles de Ujfalvy in his adopted France, Ujfalvy traveled to Samarkand and Bokhara and led an expedition to the Kashmir in 1880.

He was born at Székelykövesd/Cuieşd, in Transylvania, and died at Florence.

Ujfalvy also published under the following names: Mezőkövesdi Ujfalvy Károly Jenő, or Karl Eugen Ujfalvy von Mezőkövesd, Charles-Eugène Ujfalvy de Mezökövesd, or Mező-Kövesd.

Works 
 Alfred de Musset, eine Studie von Karl Eugen von Ujfalvy, 1870
 Poésies magyares de Pétoefi Sandor. Traduction par H. Desbordes-Valmore et Ch. E. Ujfalvÿ de Mezö-Kövesd, 1871
 La Langue magyare, son origine, ses rapports avec les langues finnoises ou tchoudes, ses particularités, 1871
 La Hongrie, son histoire, sa langue et sa littérature, 1872
 Les Migrations des peuples et particulièrement celle des Touraniens, 1873
 Poésies magyares, choix et traduction par H. Desbordes-Valmore et Ch. E. de Ujfalvy de Mezö-Kövesd, 1873
 Recherches sur le tableau ethnographique de la Bible et sur les migrations des peuples, 1873
 Aperçu général sur les migrations des peuples et influence capitale exercée sur ces migrations par la race de la Haute-Asie, 1874
 Cours complémentaire de géographie et d'histoire de l'Asie centrale et orientale à l'École spéciale des langues orientales vivantes, leçon d'ouverture, 1874
 Mélanges altaïques, 1874
 Le Pays de Thulé, 1874
 L'Ethnographie de l'Asie, 1875
 Étude comparée des langues ougro-finnoise, 1875
 Grammaire finnoise d'après les principes d'Eurén : suivie d'un recueil de morceaux choisis, 1876
 Éléments de grammaire magyare, 1876
 Principes de phonétique dans la langue finnoise ; suivi d'un essai de traduction d'un fragment du Kalévala, 1876
 Les Chasses en Asie centrale, 1878
 Voyage au Zarafchane, au Ferghanah et à Kouldja, 1878
 Les Bachkirs, les Vêpses et les antiquités finno-ougriennes et altaïques, précédés des résultats anthropologiques d'un voyage en Asie centrale, 1880
 Expédition scientifique française en Russe, en Sibérie et dans le Turkestan, 6 vols., 1878-1880
 L'Art des cuivres anciens au Cachemire et au Petit-Thibet, 1883
 Les Kalmouques, 1883
 Aus dem westlichen Himalaja, 1884
 Le Berceau des Aryas d'après des ouvrages récents, 1884
 Quelques observations sur les Tadjiks des montagnes appelés aussi Galtchas, 1887
 Les Aryens au nord et au sud de l'Hindou-Kouch, 1896
 Mémoire sur les Huns blancs (Ephtalites de l'Asie centrale, Hunas de l'Inde), et sur la déformation de leurs crânes, 1898
 Iconographie et anthropologie irano-indiennes, 1900-1902
 Le Type physique d'Alexandre le Grand d'après les auteurs anciens et les documents iconographiques, 1902

References

External links 
 https://web.archive.org/web/20060831171356/http://www.mek.ro/02100/02115/html/5-960.html 
 A MAGYAROK ÉS A KELET-KUTATÁS at www.kiszely.hu (Hungarian)
 Magyarország a XX. században / Európai és magyar nyelvtudomány at mek.oszk.hu 

Writers from Vienna
1842 births
1904 deaths
19th-century Hungarian people
19th-century linguists
Linguists from Austria
Austro-Hungarian people
Hungarian nobility
People from Mureș County
Hungarian Finno-Ugrists
Central Asian studies scholars
Explorers of Central Asia
Hungarian explorers
Members of the Société Asiatique